is a miniature Shinto shrine either found on the precincts of a larger shrine and dedicated to folk kami, or on a street side, enshrining kami not under the jurisdiction of any large shrine. Dōsojin, minor kami protecting travelers from evil spirits, can for example be enshrined in a hokora. 

See also
 Glossary of Shinto 
 Setsumatsusha

Notes

References

Architecture in Japan
Shinto in Japan
Shinto religious objects